Drenthe is a province of the Netherlands.

Drenthe may also refer to:
 Drenthe, Michigan, an unincorporated community in Zeeland Charter Township, Michigan
 Royston Drenthe (born 1987), Dutch footballer
 Drenthe University of Applied Sciences, a former Dutch university of applied sciences
 HNLMS Drenthe (D816), a destroyer of the Dutch navy